Kahilu Wildlife Sanctuary is a protected area in Myanmar's Kayin State.

History
Kahilu Wildlife Sanctuary was established in 1928 for the protection of one of the last Javan rhinoceros (Rhinoceros sondaicus) families in the country.
As of 2011, it was not managed due to security issues. The Forest Department is the responsible management authority.

Biodiversity
Most of Kahilu Wildlife Sanctuary is covered by mixed deciduous forest, consisting of teak (Tectona grandis) and iron wood (Mesua ferrea) trees. Indian hog deer (Hyelaphus porcinus), lesser mouse-deer (Tragulus kanchil) and serow (Capricornis milneedwardsii) live in this protected area. Bird species include jungle fowl, hornbill, myna, parakeets, doves, partridge, lapwing, drongos, kite and owl.

Threats
Kahilu Wildlife Sanctuary is threatened by shifting cultivation practices, collection of non-timber forest products and hunting of wildlife. It will likely be flooded if a planned dam is constructed near the confluence of Salween and Moei Rivers.

References

Protected areas of Myanmar
Protected areas established in 1928